Break the Spell is the ninth studio album from Voodoo Glow Skulls, released January 17, 2012 on Smelvis Records. It was recorded in a home studio and took four years to make.

Track listing

References

External links 
 

Voodoo Glow Skulls albums
2012 albums